Nizica is a short river in Szczecinek, Poland. It connects the lake Trzesiecko with the lake Wielimie, which is drained by the river Gwda.

Rivers of Poland
Rivers of West Pomeranian Voivodeship